Trinity Episcopal Church is a parish of the Episcopal Church in McArthur, Ohio, United States.  The parish worships in a historic church located at the intersection of Sugar and High Streets; built in the nineteenth century, it has been designated a historic site.

Construction
Trinity Episcopal Church was built in 1882 on land formerly owned by Andrew Wolf, whose donation included an adjacent house for use as a rectory.  The parish employed local contractor Oscar W. Gilman to design the building and to arrange for its construction.  Seven years after the church was finished, Gilman was again hired by the church to add the bell tower.

Architecture
Among the hallmarks of Gilman's design are a steep gabled roof, an apse, and buttresses.  The church is a fine example of the Late Gothic Revival style of architecture, due to elements such as its lancet windows of stained glass.  The walls are built of handmade bricks that rest upon a foundation of hand-cut sandstone blocks; both the sandstone and the clay for the bricks were obtained locally.

Recent history
In 1976, Trinity Episcopal Church was listed on the National Register of Historic Places because of its well-preserved historic architecture.  As a longtime McArthur landmark, it was seen as significant primarily in local history.

Trinity Episcopal remains an active parish of the Episcopal Diocese of Southern Ohio.  In 2012, its pastor was Bruce Smith.

References

Churches completed in 1882
19th-century Episcopal church buildings
Episcopal churches in Ohio
Gothic Revival church buildings in Ohio
Churches on the National Register of Historic Places in Ohio
Buildings and structures in Vinton County, Ohio
National Register of Historic Places in Vinton County, Ohio
1882 establishments in Ohio